Arnoldiella is a genus of green algae in the family Pithophoraceae.

The genus name of Arnoldiella is in honour of Vladimir Mitrofanowitch (Mitrofanovich) Arnoldi (1871-1924), a Russian professor of biology.

References

External links

Cladophorales genera
Pithophoraceae